Willard is an unincorporated community in Alexander County, Illinois, United States. Willard is located in southwest Alexander County near the Mississippi River.

References

Unincorporated communities in Alexander County, Illinois
Unincorporated communities in Illinois
Cape Girardeau–Jackson metropolitan area